Marco D'Urbano (born 15 August 1991) is an Italian former professional cyclist, who rode professionally between 2015 and 2017 for the ,  and  teams. In 2015, he won the second stage of the Rhône-Alpes Isère Tour.

References

External links

1991 births
Italian male cyclists
Living people
Sportspeople from Pescara
Cyclists from Abruzzo